George Price Hays  was the 2nd president of Washington & Jefferson College.

Hays was born in Miller's Run, Pennsylvania on February 2, 1838. He studied at Jefferson College, graduating in 1857, and at the Western Theological Seminary (now Pittsburgh Theological Seminary). He was licensed to preach in 1859. Hays continued his education and earned Doctor of Divinity degree from Lafayette College in 1870 and a LL.D. from Hanover College.

He was elected second president of Washington & Jefferson College on August 3, 1870. The inauguration was held on September 21, 1870, in the Town Hall at Washington, Pennsylvania. In 1875, the college began the expanding "Old Main" by adding a third floor and two towers, at a cost of $65,000. By 1877, the costs reached a total of $73,196.51. By 1878, the board of trustees was forced to reduce the salaries of the professors and the president. Hays submitted his resignation on December 18, 1878, but the Board of Trustees declined to accept it. On March 26, 1879, President Hays took a leave of absence without pay. On June 20, 1881, the Board of Trustees accepted Hays' resignation and he returned to the ministry full-time, preaching in Denver, Cincinnati, and Kansas City.

Bibliography

References

1838 births
1897 deaths
People from South Fayette Township, Allegheny County, Pennsylvania
Presbyterian Church in the United States of America ministers
19th-century Presbyterian ministers
Presbyterians from Pennsylvania
Lafayette College alumni
Washington & Jefferson College alumni
Presidents of Washington & Jefferson College
19th-century American clergy